Sioned Williams is a Welsh politician and a Member of the Senedd (MS) for the South Wales West region since 2021. Williams is a member of Plaid Cymru.

Early life
Williams was born in Monmouthshire and was educated at Ysgol Gymraeg Cwmbrân and Ysgol Gyfun Cwm Rhymni. She attended Aberystwyth University where she studied Welsh and English. Later, she attended Cardiff University with a S4C T. Glynne Davies Scholarship.

She was a journalist for BBC News Wales, and later worked at Academi Hywel Teifi in Swansea University, organising public events and community courses on Welsh history, culture and literature.

Williams' great uncle Dai Wil, was an agent for Aneurin Bevan in one of his early elections.

Political career
The majority of Williams' family were Labour supporters, other than her mother, who voted Plaid Cymru "to remind them that we're here". Sioned said that the miners' strike, the Campaign for Nuclear Disarmament and the campaign to establish S4C were all "certainly formative features of my youth". A self-proclaimed democratic socialist, she became a member of Plaid because "[she] felt that the Labour lordship of the Gwent Valleys where [she] grew up had become a damaging hegemony, which had lost contact with the culture and people it once represented and defended." Furthermore, Williams believes "the current UK political system does not offer the people of Wales an equitable and prosperous future."

In the 2017 local elections, Williams contested the Alltwen ward on Neath Port Talbot council.

Sioned is the Plaid Cymru spokesperson for post-16 education, Social Justice and Equalities, having held these portfolios since her election. She is also a member of the Senedd's cross party committees for Children, Young People and Education; and Equality and Social Justice.

Sioned previously served as a Community Councillor for Alltwen and chaired the Cilybebyll Community Council prior to her term as an MS. She was also head of strategic communications for Plaid Cymru from January 2013 to December 2014.

Sioned has campaigned passionately on many matters of social justice and inequality since her election. Notably, she successfully helped to secure a reopening of the enquiry into the Gleision Colliery mining accident in Cilybebyll after campaigning alongside the victims’ families for several years.

Personal life
Sioned's husband, Daniel Gwydion Williams, is a professor of English Literature at Swansea University; he is also a writer and a semi-professional jazz musician. The couple live in Alltwen, Swansea Valley with her husband, Daniel and their two teenage children.

References

BBC Cymru Wales newsreaders and journalists
Female members of the Senedd
Living people
Plaid Cymru members of the Senedd
Wales MSs 2021–2026
Welsh republicans
Welsh socialists
Welsh-speaking politicians
1971 births